John Smith (1 July 1919 – 25 June 1999) was a New Zealand cricketer who played first-class cricket for Canterbury from 1943 to 1946.

A middle-order batsman, Smith made his highest first-class score against Otago in 1945–46, when he made 20 and 51. In February 1944, playing against Wellington, he was run out for 43 by the bowler, Ray Allen, while backing up; Allen had previously warned him against leaving the crease too soon.

References

External links
 

1919 births
1999 deaths
New Zealand cricketers
Cricketers from Christchurch
Canterbury cricketers